The  Ilot Madame Museum is a museum located on the island of  Île Sainte-Marie in Madagascar. The museum displays the piracy history of the island.

References

Museums in Analanjirofo